Naoto Oku (born 16 October 1971) is a Japanese archer. He competed in the men's individual and team events at the 1992 Summer Olympics.

References

1971 births
Living people
Japanese male archers
Olympic archers of Japan
Archers at the 1992 Summer Olympics
Sportspeople from Kanagawa Prefecture